Swabhimaan may refer to:

 Swabhimana, the 1985 Kannada film
 Swabhimaan, the 1995 Hindi TV series
 Swabhimaan (campaign), the financial scheme of the Indian government launched in 2014
 Swabhiman - Shodh Astitvacha, the 2021 Marathi TV series

See also 
 Swabhimani Shetkari Saghtana, a farmers union based in Kolhapur, Maharashtra
 Swabhimani Paksha, a political party in Maharashtra